The Miller House is a historic house at 1853 South Ringo Street in Little Rock, Arkansas.  Built in 1906 and twice enlarged by the same owner, the house is a reflection of the effect of segregation in the United States.  Now a two-story brick-faced Craftsman-styled structured, it was originally built as a modest single-story cottage typical of the segregated African-American neighborhood in which it was located.  It was purchased in 1924 by Arthur T. Miller, who was employed in a comparatively secure position as a railroad mail clerk.  Prevented by segregation from moving to more affluent neighborhoods, Miller chose to enlarge the house, and then finish it in brick.

The house was listed on the National Register of Historic Places in 1999.

See also
National Register of Historic Places listings in Little Rock, Arkansas

References

Houses on the National Register of Historic Places in Arkansas
Houses completed in 1924
Houses in Little Rock, Arkansas
National Register of Historic Places in Little Rock, Arkansas
Individually listed contributing properties to historic districts on the National Register in Arkansas